Shumikha is a town and the administrative center of Shumikhinsky District in Kurgan Oblast, Russia, located  west of Kurgan, the administrative center of the oblast. Population:

History
It was founded in 1892 as a settlement around the railway station of the same name (opened in 1896). It was granted town status in 1944.

Administrative and municipal status
Within the framework of administrative divisions, Shumikha serves as the administrative center of Shumikhinsky District. As an administrative division, it is incorporated within Shumikhinsky District as Shumikha Town Under District Jurisdiction. As a municipal division, Shumikha Town Under District Jurisdiction is incorporated within Shumikhinsky Municipal District as Shumikha Urban Settlement.

References

Notes

Sources

Cities and towns in Kurgan Oblast